"Follow That Dream" is a song first recorded by Elvis Presley as part of the soundtrack for his 1962 motion picture Follow That Dream.

It was also in 1962 released as the first track of the EP Follow That Dream.

The song peaked at number 15 on the Billboard Hot 100 and at number 5 on the Billboard Easy Listening chart.

Writing and recording 
The song was written by Fred Wise (lyrics) and Ben Weisman (music). Elvis Presley recorded it on July 2, 1961, in the RCA Studio B in Nashville, Tennessee.

Bruce Springsteen versions 
Bruce Springsteen said "Follow That Dream" was one of his favorite Elvis songs.  He began performing a rearranged version of the song on the European leg of the River Tour in April 1981, at a much slower pace and with altered lyrics. This version appears in a bootleg vinyl recording of the same name. He later further revised the lyrics, and recorded the song during the Born in the U.S.A. sessions, although it remained unreleased. He performed the song in July 1988 in Switzerland, and many times in succeeding decades.

Charts

References

External links 
 Follow That Dream (EP) at Discogs

Film theme songs
1960 songs
Songs about dreams
Elvis Presley songs
Songs with lyrics by Fred Wise (songwriter)
Songs with music by Ben Weisman
Songs written for films